Buffalo RiverWorks is a multipurpose indoor venue and restaurant located on the shore of the Buffalo River in Buffalo, New York.

History

The property incorporates the original Wheeler grain elevator that was built in 1909.

Notable events

Featuring two open-air hockey rinks, the venue has hosted the Labatt Blue Pond Hockey Tournament since 2014 and the Queen City Roller Derby since 2016.

In 2017, the venue was home to the Buffalo Blitz of the Can-Am Indoor Football League.

The annual music festival and professional wrestling event TID The Season, promoted by Every Time I Die, has taken place at the venue from 2017 to 2021. The 2021 event included the final performances by Every Time I Die before their breakup.

Many other professional wrestling events have taken place at the venue, including Global Wars 2017, Global Wars 2018, ROH/NJPW War of the Worlds 2019, and several NXT house shows.

The Buffalo Beauts of the Premier Hockey Federation have hosted the annual Buffalo Believes Classic at the venue since 2019.

References

External links

Official website

2014 establishments in New York (state)
Boxing venues in New York (state)
Buildings and structures in Buffalo, New York
Music venues in New York (state)
Restaurants established in 2014
Restaurants in Buffalo, New York
Sports venues completed in 2014
Sports venues in Erie County, New York
Wrestling venues in New York (state)